Theodotus ( "given by God" or "given by gods") is the name of:
Theodotus of Aetolia (3rd century BC), an Aetolian general who held the command of Coele-Syria for Ptolemy Philopator (221–204 BC), king of Egypt
Theodotus Hemiolius (3rd century BC), a general in the service of king Antiochus III the Great (223–187 BC)
Theodotus of Chios (1st century BC), rhetoric tutor of the young Egyptian king Ptolemy XIII
Theodotus of Byzantium (2nd century), an early Christian writer from Byzantium
Theodotus of Ancyra (martyr) (4th century), fourth-century Christian martyr
Theodotus of Laodicea, bishop (c.310–c.335)
Theodotus (praefectus urbi), Praefectus urbi of Constantinople
Theodotus of Antioch (died 429), patriarch of Antioch in 420–429
Theodotus of Ancyra (bishop) (5th century), a fifth-century bishop of Ancyra
Theodotus I of Constantinople, Ecumenical Patriarch in 815–821
Theodotus II of Constantinople (1070s–1153), Ecumenical Patriarch in 1151–1153
Theodotos Kalothetos, a senior official and governor in the Empire of Nicaea
 Theodotus of Caesarea, third-century Christian martyr

See also
 Theodote (disambiguation)
 Theodotos inscription
 Fedot, Russian form
 Aurelius Theodotus, a Roman general of emperor Gallienus
 William Theodotus Capers (1867–1943), a bishop of the Diocese of West Texas in the Episcopal Church